Australian Sailing Hall of Fame was established in 2017 by Australian Sailing in collaboration with the Australian National Maritime Museum. There are two nomination categories: the sailor or athlete category; and the general category which recognises those who have played a critical supporting role such as an official, coach or similar.

Hall of Fame

References

External links
Australian Sailing Hall of Fame

Sailing in Australia
Australian sports trophies and awards
Halls of fame in Australia
Awards established in 2017
2017 establishments in Australia